Tutluca can refer to:

 Tutluca, Alaca
 Tutluca, Bozkurt